Shams Naved Usmani (1931 –  26 August 1993) was an Indian Muslim scholar. He belonged to the Usmani family of Deoband and was an alumnus of the University of Lucknow. He held the titles of Acharya and Maulana together. He was known for his inter-faith dialogues.

Birth and education

Shams Naved Usmani was born in Deoband into the Usmani family in 1931. Islamic scholar Shabbir Ahmad Usmani was one of his uncles.

Usmani received his primary Islamic education at home. He learnt Sanskrit on his own and did his post-graduation from the University of Lucknow.

Academic studies and literary works
Usmani studied Hindu scriptures and identified Noah as Manu. He stated that Vedas are divine, but corrupted books, as the Islamic traditions hold belief about Injil and Torah. He has accused Hindus of attributing wrong beliefs to Manu.

According to Tabish Mehdi, "the results that came out of his studies created an atmosphere of restlessness in the academic world". His studies received a wide criticism from the academics of India. Usmani held the titles of Acharya and Maulana altogether.

Usmani himself did not write any books. However, his anecdotes were collected and compiled by Syed Abdullah Tariq. These works include Agar Abh Bhi Na Jāge To.

Death and legacy
Usmani died on 26 August 1993. He was survived by his wife Khadeja Naved Usmani.

References

Bibliography
 

1931 births
1993 deaths
People from Deoband
Usmani family
University of Lucknow alumni